Persoonia bowgada is a species of flowering plant in the family Proteaceae and is endemic to the south-west of Western Australia. It is an erect to spreading shrub with smooth bark, more or less cylindrical leaves and yellow flowers in groups of up to ten on the ends of branches.

Description

Taxonomy and naming
Persoonia bowgada was first formally described in 1994 by Peter Weston in the journal Telopea from specimens collected by J.S. Beard north of the Murchison River in 1980. The specific epithet (bowgada) is a reference to the bowgada (Acacia ramulosa var. linophylla) community in which this species often occurs, and to the species' superficial similarity to the acacia.

Distribution and habitat
This geebung grows in bowgada woodland, euycalypt woodland and mallee heath within  of the coast between Shark Bay and the Murchison River in the south-west of Western Australia.

Conservation status
Persoonia bowgada is classified as "not threatened" by the Western Australian Government Department of Parks and Wildlife.

References

bowgada
Flora of Western Australia
Plants described in 1994
Taxa named by Peter H. Weston